Mulee'aage (Dhivehi: މުލިއާގެ, pronounced ) is the "Official Residence of the President of the Maldives". The Mulee'aage is located in the ward of Henveiru in the historic center of Malé. It is in close proximity of the Medhu Ziyaarai shrine, the Friday Mosque, and the Munnaru (Grand Minaret of Malé).

History

The Beginning
The construction of Mulee'aage was initiated in the year 1914 and completed in 1919. It was commissioned by Sultan Muhammad Shamsuddeen III for his son and heir Prince Hassan Izzuddin. It was built on the style of bungalows, in vogue during the colonial era in Ceylon and completed in preparation for the return of Prince Hassan Izzuddin to Male' in 1920 after completing his education at the Royal College of Colombo.

Mulee'aage, meaning the "new house of Muli" was built on the site of Mulee'ge, the ancestral home of Shamsuddeen. Mulee'aage was also the home of the Sultan Hasan 'Izz ud-din (or "Dhon Bandaarain" 1759–66). It was the private residence of Dhon Bandaarain's mother, Amina Dhiyo daughter of Mohamed, the Katheeb of Muli. It remained with the Huraa Dynasty rulers throughout its history. The last occupant of Mulee'aage was Prince Mulee'ge Manippulhu, who later ascended the throne as Sultan Muhammad Shamsuddeen III in 1892.

Neither Mulee'aage nor Mulee'ge ever served as a Royal Palace. However, it is located just a stone's throw away from the site of the former royal palace, now the Sultan's Park and the National Museum of Maldives. Most of the buildings in the royal palace grounds were demolished during Ibrahim Nasir's presidency in the late 1960s. As such, today the nearest one could get to a royal Maldivian palace is Mulee'aage in Male’ and the Utheemu Ganduvaru on the island of Utheemu.

Mulee'aage was occupied by Prince Hassan Izzuddin between 1920 and 1934. The house did not prove auspicious for the prince, though apparently he spent a lot of time there. It was famous throughout Male' as a place for merriment and gaiety with numerous music and dance performances organized by the young prince for his entertainment. Izzuddin however soon became the victim of a smear campaign organized by his uncle Al Ameer Abdul Majeed Rannabandeyri Kilegefaanu and cousin Hassan Fareed. Ultimately he was discredited and banished in 1934 to the isolated southerly island of Fuvahmulah where he died in 1938.

Rise and Fall of the First Republic
Following Prince Izzudin's arrest, Mulee'aage remained abandoned and in disuse until the second World War, when it was used as the Ministry of Home Affairs by Mohamed Amin Didi. Following the abolition of the Maldivian Monarchy in 1952, the new President Mohamed Amin Didi officially made Mulee'aage the Presidential Palace on January 1, 1953. Following Amin's ouster later that year it became the Prime Minister's Office under Ibrahim Faamuladheyri Kilegefaanu after the restoration of the monarchy under Sultan Muhammad Fareed Didi.

Between 1960 and 1964 Mulee'aage served as the residence and office of the British Government Political Agent, Humphrey Arthington-Davy. He was the first British official posted to Male. Following demonstrations and acts of sabotage directed against Arthington-Davy, he later lived mainly at his retreat in Dhoonidhoo Island across the lagoon from Male.

During the Second Republic
After a long period of disuse, the first president of the second republic,  Ibrahim Nasir Rannabandeyri Kilegefan once again declared Mulee'aage as the Presidential Palace in 1968. Although it was the official residence of the president, Nasir only took temporary residence at Mulee'aage while his own house, Velaanaa'ge, was under construction. Initially, President Maumoon Abdul Gayyoom resided at Mulee'aage for the first two decades of his presidency. However, deeming Mulee'aage insufficient, Maumoom commissioned Theemuge to be built and declared it the official Presidential Palace in 1998. Mulee'aage was under much neglect and it served as the President's Office and later the Supreme Court during the latter years of Maumoon's presidency.

In 2008, after defeating Maumoon Abdul Gayyoom in the Maldives' first democratic multi-party elections, Mohamed Nasheed became the third president of the second republic. Nasheed was a strong critic of Maumoon's government and its alleged overspending.  On these grounds, president Nasheed refused to use Theemuge because of the high costs of maintaining it as a house of residence and stayed at his own house Yaagoothu'ge for the first few months of his presidency. However, on February 4, 2009, Nasheed moved to Mulee'aage, once again declaring it the official residence of the Maldivian president. In 2011, Nasheed installed a solar photovoltaic energy system on the roof of Mulee'aage with the aim of promoting sustainable energy and sending a global message on climate leadership. After the resignation of Nasheed in February 2012, the palace became vacant.

Famous guests who stayed at Mulee'aage include Prime Minister Rajiv Gandhi of India under president Maumoon. Queen Elizabeth II and her husband, Prince Philip, the Duke of Edinburgh were entertained at an evening reception in 1972 by President Nasir during the couple's 2-day state visit to Male on board the Royal Yacht Britannia.

Usage of building

Medhu Ziyaarai
Medhu Ziyaarai (literally 'Central Tomb') was a part of the original Mulee'aage building. Today, it is an enclave of Mulee'aage; separate from the building. It houses the tomb of Moroccan scholar Abul Barakat Yousef Al-Berberi, who is believed to have introduced Islam to the nation in 1153.

See also 
Theemuge
History of the Maldives
President of the Maldives
List of Sultans of the Maldives

External links
Ministry of Tourism, Arts and Culture (Department of Heritage)

References

Divehi Tārīkhah Au Alikameh. Divehi Bahāi Tārikhah Khidmaiykurā Qaumī Markazu. Reprint 1958 edn. Male’ 1990.
H.C.P. Bell, The Maldive Islands, An account of the physical features, History, Inhabitants, Productions and Trade. Colombo 1883, .
Mulee'aage Thārīkhah Therein. A TVM programme telecasted on 4 February 2009.

Presidents of the Maldives
Malé
Houses completed in 1919
Presidential residences
Government buildings in the Maldives
1919 establishments in Asia
1919 establishments in the British Empire